First Nations Media Australia (FNMA), formerly Indigenous Remote Communications Association (IRCA), is the national peak body for Aboriginal Australians and Torres Strait Islander not-for-profit broadcasting, media and communications.

The Indigenous Remote Communications Association Aboriginal and Torres Strait Islanders Corporation (IRCA) was officially established as the peak body for remote Indigenous media and communications in 2001 at the Remote Video Festival held at Umuwa, SA. It expanded its role and representation to become the national peak body for the Aboriginal and Torres Strait Islander broadcasting, media and communications industry in 2016–2017.

FNMA runs a number of annual events, including the National Remote Indigenous Media Festival,  in its 21st year in September 2019.

First Sounds is a collaborative effort by the Community Broadcasting Association of Australia (CBAA) and FNMA to get more Aboriginal and Torres Strait Islander artists played and heard on Australian radio music industry.

On 1 June 2021, the Australian Broadcasting Corporation announced a partnership with FNMA for a period of 12 months, with the two organisations sharing knowledge and staff to bring more Indigenous voices and stories to Australian media.

See also
Indigenous music of Australia

References

External links

Organisations serving Indigenous Australians
Community radio organizations
Community radio stations in Australia
Organizations established in 2001
2001 establishments in Australia